Fatimatou Sacko (born April 12, 1985 in Paris) is a French basketball player. She plays for Basket Lattes Montpellier Agglomération in the country's top women's league, the Ligue Féminine de Basketball.

References

French women's basketball players
1985 births
Basketball players from Paris
Living people